Adams Square is a former unincorporated community now incorporated into Glendale in Los Angeles County, California. It lies at an elevation of 502 feet (153 m).

References

Neighborhoods in Glendale, California